The open primary election for the 1978 United States Senate election in Louisiana was held on September 16, 1978.

Incumbent Senator J. Bennett Johnston won the election with 59.40% of the vote and was declared elected by a majority, dispelling the need for a general election in November.

Candidates

Democratic Party
 J. Bennett Johnston, incumbent Senator
 Woody Jenkins, State Representative

Results

Primary election

General election
By virtue of Johnston's majority of the vote in the primary election, he was unopposed in the general election. Under Louisiana state law at the time, it was not required to tabulate votes for unopposed candidates.

See also 
 1978 United States Senate elections

References 

Single-candidate elections
1978
Louisiana
United States Senate